Tindariidae is a family of clams of the order Nuculanida.

Genera
 Spinula (Dall, 1908)
 Spinula calcar (Dall, 1908)
 Spinula oceanica Filatova, 1958
 Spinula bogorovi Filatova, 1958
 Spinula vityazi Filatova, 1964
 Spinula tasmanica Knudsen, 1970
 Spinula pelvisshikokuensis Okutani, 1975-b
 Tindaria Bellardi, 1875
 Tindaria acinula
 Tindaria aeolata (Dall, 1890)
 Tindaria agathida (Dall, 1890)
 Tindaria amabilis (Dall, 1889)
 Tindaria brunnea
 Tindaria californica
 Tindaria callistiformis Verrill & Bush, 1897
 Tindaria cervola
 Tindaria cytherea (Dall, 1881)
 Tindaria dicofania
 Tindaria erebus Clarke, 1959
 Tindaria kennerlyi
 Tindaria lata Verrill & Bush, 1897
 Tindaria miniscula
 Tindaria smithii (Dall, 1886)
 Tindaria striata (King & Broderip, 1832)
 Tindaria virens (Dall, 1890)

References
 

 
Bivalve families